The Million Eyes of Sumuru is a 1967 British spy film produced by Harry Alan Towers, directed by Lindsay Shonteff and filmed at the Shaw Brothers studios in Hong Kong. It stars Frankie Avalon and George Nader, with Shirley Eaton as the title character Sumuru. It was based on a series of novels by Sax Rohmer about a megalomaniacal femme fatale.

The film was released in the U.S. by American International Pictures on 17 May 1967. In the U.K., it was released through Warner-Pathé on 3 December, titled simply Sumuru. Terry Bourke was production manager.

Plot
Sumuru is a beautiful and evil woman who plans world domination by having her sexy all-female army eliminate male leaders and replace them with her female agents.

The Chief of Security for President Boong of Sinonesia is killed. Two Americans in Hong Kong, Nick West and his friend Tommy Carter, are persuaded by the head of British intelligence, Colonel Baisbrook, to investigate. They discover the organisation headed by Sumuru, which claims to be interested in peaceful activities.

A dead girl winds up in Nick's bed and he ends up being framed for murder. Nick and Tommy go to Hong Kong to stop an assassination.

Cast

 Frankie Avalon as Agent Tommy Carter
 George Nader as Agent Nick West
 Shirley Eaton as Sumuru
 Wilfrid Hyde-White as Colonel Sir Anthony Baisbrook
 Klaus Kinski as President Boong
 Patti Chandler as Louise
 Salli Sachse as Mikki
 Ursula Rank as Erno
 Krista Nell as Zoe
 Maria Rohm as Helga Martin
 Paul Chang Chungas as Inspector Koo
 Essie Lin Chia as Kitty (as Essie Huang)
 Jon Fong as Colonel Medika
 Denise Davreux as Sumuru Guard
 Mary Cheng as Sumuru Guard
 Jill Hamilton as Sumuru Guard
 Lisa Gray as Sumuru Guard
 Christine Lok as Sumuru Guard
 Margaret Cheung as Sumuru Guard
 Louise Lee as Sumuru Guard

Legacy
Shirley Eaton reprised her role as Sumuru in Jess Franco's follow-up The Girl from Rio (1969). Eaton later said "I did enjoy being the wicked lady Sumuru in two rather bad films, which I had not had the chance to be before." However, she retired from acting shortly afterwards.

The Million Eyes of Sumuru inspired riot grrrl musician Lois Maffeo to adopt Bikini Kill as a band name. She and her friend Margaret Doherty used the name for a one-off performance where they donned faux fur punk cave girl costumes. Tobi Vail liked the name and appropriated it for the iconic punk group after Maffeo settled on the band name Cradle Robbers.

The film is used in Episode 18 of the KTMA season of Mystery Science Theater 3000 as well as an episode in Season 13.
It is also featured as a video on demand from its spiritual successor RiffTrax.

References

External links

 
 Episode guide: K18- The Million Eyes of Sumuru

1967 films
1960s spy thriller films
British spy thriller films
1960s English-language films
Films directed by Lindsay Shonteff
Films scored by John Scott (composer)
Films shot in Hong Kong
1960s British films
English-language thriller films